The 2017–18 Texas A&M–Corpus Christi Islanders men's basketball team represented Texas A&M University–Corpus Christi in the 2017–18 NCAA Division I men's basketball season. The Islanders were led by head coach Willis Wilson, in his seventh season at Texas A&M–Corpus Christi as members of the Southland Conference. They played their home games at the American Bank Center and the Dugan Wellness Center. They finished the season 11–18, 8–10 in Southland play to finish in a three-way tie for eighth place. Due to tiebreakers, they received the No. 8 seed in the Southland tournament where they lost to New Orleans in the first round.

Previous season
The Islanders finished the 2016–17 season 24–12, 12–6 in Southland play to finish in a three-way tie for second place. They defeated Stephen F. Austin to advance to the championship game of the Southland tournament where they lost to New Orleans. They received an invitation to the CollegeInsider.com Tournament where they defeated Georgia State, Weber State, Fort Wayne, and UMBC to advance to the championship game where they lost to Saint Peter's.

Roster

Schedule and results

|-
!colspan=9 style=| Exhibition

|-
!colspan=9 style=| Non-conference regular season

|-
!colspan=9 style=|Southland regular season

|-
!colspan=9 style=| Southland tournament

See also
2017–18 Texas A&M–Corpus Christi Islanders women's basketball team

References

Texas A&M–Corpus Christi Islanders men's basketball seasons
Texas AandM-Corpus Christi
Texas AandM-Corpus Christi Islanders basketball
Texas AandM-Corpus Christi Islanders basketball